Pintor is a surname. Notable people with the surname include:

Luigi Pintor (1925–2003), Italian politician and journalist
Lupe Pintor (born 1955), Mexican boxer
Pietro Pintor (1880–1940), Italian general
Sergio Pintor (born 1937), Italian Roman Catholic bishop